The 2008–09 Serie B season was the seventy-seventh since its establishment.  A total of 22 teams will contest the league, 15 of which will be returning from the 2007–08 season, four of which will have been promoted from Serie C1 (now Lega Pro Prima Divisione), and three relegated from Serie A.

Teams

Noted teams featured in the league include Parma F.C., who last played Serie B in 1989–90 when under coach Nevio Scala they won their first promotion to the top flight.

U.S. Sassuolo Calcio, promoted to Serie B as Serie C1/A champions, are competing at the highest level in the club's history.  A vacancy created by the withdrawal of Sicilian squad F.C. Messina Peloro was filled by the federation by including U.S. Avellino, who were the best team slated to be relegated in 2007–08.

Stadiums and locations

Personnel and kits

Events
Following the end of the 2007–08 season, rumours spread out regarding Messina's financial struggles which might lead the team to insolvency and following exclusion from the Serie B teamlist. This was implicitly confirmed by the fact that Messina has not organized a pre-season camp as of 10 July, and the team being still without a coach. On 14 July 2008 the club board announced their intention to resign from the Serie B due to financial difficulties, also stating their intention to start again from amateur league Serie D.

On 25 July 2008 the Italian Football Federation confirmed that Avellino had been readmitted to Serie B to replace Messina.

On 31 July 2008 Treviso was penalized 3 points; however it ultimately changed to €15,000 fine by Camera di Conciliazione e Arbitrato per lo Sport of CONI.

Brescia and Parma were the first clubs to sack their managers. The rondinelle sacked Serse Cosmi, with past UEFA Champions League experience at Udinese, replacing him with well-experienced 67-year-old boss Nedo Sonetti, whereas Parma opted to dismiss Luigi Cagni from the coaching post and appoint former Palermo boss Francesco Guidolin. Brescia completed its replacement prior to the two club's meeting in Brescia in Week 6, Parma the day after. Several other coaching dismissals soon followed, regarding Avellino (former Foggia boss Salvatore Campilongo replacing Giuseppe Incocciati), Ascoli (former Juventus youth team coach Vincenzo Chiarenza taking over from Nello Di Costanzo) and Mantova (with former AC Milan assistant Alessandro Costacurta replacing Giuseppe Brucato). Chiarenza and Salernitana gaffer Fabrizio Castori went in December, but Castori was soon reinstated after Bortolo Mutti's inconsistency. The shortest reign was former Argentina striker Abel Balbo, who resigned after only 4 weeks in the job. Castori was sacked again after a 2–2 draw with Treviso, and Grosseto, Modena, Pisa and Mantova also lost their coaches.

On 8 May 2009 Livorno 0–1 home loss to Triestina ensured Bari to be mathematically promoted to Serie A in advance of four weeks. The galletti, coached by former Juventus player Antonio Conte, will therefore make their return to the top flight after eight years in the Italian second division. On 11 May, Treviso was mathematically relegated to Lega Pro Prima Divisione following a 0–1 home loss to Veneto rivals Vicenza after being in the Serie A as late as the 2005–06 season.

On 16 May, Parma joined Bari by ensuring automatic promotion to Serie A in Week 40, following a 2–2 tie with Cittadella that left a gap of seven points between Francesco Guidolin's team and closest rivals Livorno with only two games remaining.

League table

Results

Top goalscorers
Updated to games played on 30 May 2009

 24 goals
  Francesco Tavano (Livorno)
 23 goals
  Barreto (Bari)
 18 goals
  Salvatore Bruno (Modena)
  Riccardo Meggiorini (Cittadella)
 17 goals
  Salvatore Mastronunzio (Ancona)
  Daniele Vantaggiato (Rimini/Parma)
 16 goals
  Alessandro Noselli (Sassuolo)
 15 goals
  Andrea Caracciolo (Brescia)
  Éder (Frosinone)
  Marco Sansovini (Grosseto)
 13 goals
  Arturo Di Napoli (Salernitana)
  Alessandro Diamanti (Livorno)
  Francesco Ruopolo (AlbinoLeffe)
 12 goals
  Saša Bjelanović (Vicenza)
  Francesco Lodi (Empoli)
  Cristiano Lucarelli (Parma)
  Alberto Paloschi (Parma)
  Thomas Pichlmann (Grosseto)
  Nicola Pozzi (Empoli)

Play-off

Promotion
Semi-finals
First legs played 7 June 2009; return legs played 11 June 2009

Finals
First leg played 14 June 2009; return leg played 20 June 2009

Relegation
First leg played 6 June 2009; return leg played 13 June 2009

Managerial changes

References

Serie B seasons
2008–09 in Italian football leagues
Italy